Lomax is a ghost town in Custer County, Nebraska, United States.

History
A post office was established at Lomax in 1889, and remained in operation until being discontinued in 1921. The town was named for Harvard Lomax, a Nebraska legislator.

References

Geography of Custer County, Nebraska